The 1988 World Badminton Grand Prix was the sixth edition of the World Badminton Grand Prix finals. It was held in Hong Kong, from January 4 to January 8, 1989.

Final results

References
Smash: World Grand Prix Finals, Hong Kong 1988

World Grand Prix
World Badminton Grand Prix
B
Badminton in Hong Kong